Attorney General Burke may refer to:

Denis Burke (Australian politician) (born 1948), Attorney-General of the Northern Territory
T. J. Burke (born 1972), Attorney General of New Brunswick

See also
General Burke (disambiguation)